The Philippine Council was founded in 1923 by the Rotary Club of Manila to organize Scouting activities in the Philippines. The founding/charter members were all prominent figures in the commercial, political, social, and cultural scene of Manila. Most held simultaneous memberships in a number of organizations, such as the YMCA, the American Chamber of Commerce of the Philippine Islands, the Masons, the Elks, the Army and Navy Club, etc.  The Council was disbanded when the Boy Scouts of the Philippines was inaugurated in 1938.

Historical highlights

In 1927, the BSA's Boys' Life magazine, reported: 

In 1931, Boys' Life magazine, reported: 

In 1932,  The heroism of Scout William Warmsley of Tuguegaráo in 1931 was mentioned by BSA Chief Scout Executive James West inBoys' Life. Also in the same year, three Scouts of the Philippine Council were awarded the Gold Medal for saving life, the BSA Shanghai District was placed under the jurisdiction of the Philippine Council, and the award of the Silver Buffalo was given to Dwight Filley Davis for active "support of Scouting in the Philippines while Governor General of the Islands", 1929–32.

In 1933, the Philippine Council delegation of 6 Scouts and 1 Scouter joined the Boy Scouts of America contingent to the 4th World Scout Jamboree in Gödöllő, Hungary. The Council also qualified for the President Roosevelt Award.

In 1934, Arthur Frederick Fischer, Director of the Bureau of Forestry, issued Special Order No. 52, March 27, 1934, directing Forestry staff to prepare a Boy Scout forestry handbook. In the same year, the Rover scheme was introduced.

In 1935, the first National Jamboree of the BSA, scheduled for 21–30 August in Washington, D.C., was cancelled due to a polio outbreak.  The Philippine Council contingent of 32 boys and 3 men toured the US making presentations of Philippine culture. James West, in words and photographs, reported on the tour and exhibitions by the Philippine Council contingent.

In 1936, the Boy Scouts of the Philippines organization was founded through the efforts of Philippine Council President Josephus Stevenot, supported by the vital roles played by Tomás Confesór and Manuel L. Quezon. Stevenot, the actual Founder, performed the actual organizational work of establishing the BSP. He prepared the draft document for the BSP's establishment and lobbied the proposal at the National Assembly.

In 1937, the Philippine Council officials met on 11 October and resolved to transfer the Council's jurisdiction, authority, and assets to the Boy Scouts of the Philippines organization. The Council turned over its assets and its jurisdiction for Filipino boys to the Boy Scouts of the Philippines on 31 December.

References

Further reading
 
 
 

Scouting in the Philippines
 
Insular Government of the Philippine Islands